Scopula saphes is a moth of the family Geometridae first described by Louis Beethoven Prout in 1920. It is found in New Guinea.

References

External links

Moths described in 1920
saphes
Moths of New Guinea